was a daimyō in late-Edo period Japan, who ruled Yokosuka Domain in Tōtōmi Province.

Tadakata was the fourth son of Nishio Tadayoshi, and succeeded his father as head of the Nishio clan and daimyō of Yokosuka in 1829. HIs wife was a daughter of Matsudaira Muneakira, daimyō of Miyazu Domain in Tango Province, but he had no children. He retired due to illness in 1843, yielding the clan leadership to his adopted son Tadasaka. Tadakata died in Yokosuka Castle on June 18, 1857, at age 47. His grave is located at the Nishio clan temple of Ryumin-ji in modern Kakegawa, Shizuoka.

Notes

References
 Nishio family genealogy
 Japanese Wiki article on Tadakata

Nishio clan
1811 births
1857 deaths
Fudai daimyo
People from Tokyo